Frank Brooks may refer to:

 Frank Brooks (baseball) (born 1978), Major League Baseball player
 Frank Brooks (sportsman) (1884–1952), Southern Rhodesian cricketer, rugby union player and tennis player
 Frank Leonard Brooks (1911–2011), Canadian artist
 Frank P. Brooks, member of the Mississippi House of Representatives

See also
 Franklin E. Brooks (1860–1916), U.S. Representative from Colorado